{{Infobox alpine ski racer
|name          = Davide Simoncelli
|image         = Davide Simoncelli Hinterstoder 2011.jpg
|image_size    = 180px
|caption       = Simoncelli in February 2011
|disciplines   = Giant Slalom
|club          = G.S. Fiamme Oro
|birth_date    = 
|birth_place   = Rovereto, Italy
|height        = 175 cm
|wcdebut       = December 13, 1999 (age 20)
|retired       = March 21, 2015 (age 36)
|website       = 
|olympicteams  = 2 – (2006–10)
|olympicmedals = 0
|olympicgolds  = 
|worldsteams   = 5 – (2001–05, 2009–11)
|worldsmedals  = 0
|worldsgolds   = 
|wcseasons     = 13 – (2001–13)|wcwins        = 2 – (2 GS) 
|wcpodiums     = 8 – (8 GS) 
|wcoveralls    = 0 – (22nd in 2010)|wctitles      = 0 – (4th in GS: 2006, 2010)|medals         = 

| show-medals   = yes
}}

Davide Simoncelli (born January 30, 1979 in Rovereto) is a former World Cup alpine ski racer from Italy who specialized in giant slalom.

Simoncelli made his World Cup debut in 1999. He took two World Cup victories and eight podium finishes, all in giant slalom. He took five podiums on the Gran Risa'' track of Alta Badia, with a victory and four second places. He finished fourth in the World Cup points standings for giant slalom twice, in 2006 and 2010. Simoncelli competed for Italy in three Olympics and seven World Championships. He was also Italian giant slalom champion in 2012 and 2013. He announced his retirement from competition in March 2015.

World Cup podiums
 2 wins – (2 GS)  
 8 podiums – (8 GS)

Season standings

References

External links
 
 Salomon – alpine racing – Davide Simoncelli

1979 births
Living people
People from Rovereto
Italian male alpine skiers
Olympic alpine skiers of Italy
Alpine skiers at the 2006 Winter Olympics
Alpine skiers at the 2010 Winter Olympics
Alpine skiers of Fiamme Oro
Alpine skiers at the 2014 Winter Olympics
Sportspeople from Trentino
Italian alpine skiing coaches